Grid News, also known as "GRID," is a digital media company based in Washington, D.C. It launched in January 2022. GRID is led by Mark Bauman as its President and Chief Executive Office, and Laura McGann as its Executive Editor. It publishes a podcast called "Bad Takes" hosted by GRID contributor Matthew Yglesias and McGann.

GRID's corporate entity is Media Investment Properties OpCo LLC, a Delaware Domestic Limited Liability Company.

United Arab Emirates Royal Family Funding 
Initial funding of $10 million for GRID was provided by the royal family of the United Arab Emirates (UAE) and Brian Edelman. The funding from the UAE royal family came to GRID through a private investment firm based in Abu Dhabi named International Media Investments. International Media Investments is a subsidiary of the Abu Dhabi Media Investment Corporation, which is privately owned by UAE Deputy Prime Minister Mansour bin Zayed Al Nahyan.

GRID utilized APCO Worldwide, a PR firm that is registered with the United States Department of Justice as a Foreign agent of entities in the United Arab Emirates, to perform "consulting services" in connection with its launch. APCO Worldwide Senior Advisor John Defterios also sits on GRID's board.

Connection to Biden White House 
Immediately before becoming communications director for Vice President Kamala Harris, Jamal Simmons was paid $60,000 in "Consulting Fees" by GRID's corporate entity for work between August 2021 and January 2022 to launch a "reoccurring online interview segment."

References 

Companies established in 2022
News websites